The 1987–88 season was Heart of Midlothian F.C.s 5th consecutive season of play in the Scottish Premier Division. Hearts also competed in the Scottish Cup and the Scottish League Cup.

Fixtures

Friendlies

League Cup

Scottish Cup

East of Scotland Shield

Scottish Premier Division

Scottish Premier Division table

Squad information

|}

See also
List of Heart of Midlothian F.C. seasons

References

 Statistical Record 87-88

External links
 Official Club website

Heart of Midlothian F.C. seasons
Heart of Midlothian